In human geography, a catchment area is the area from which a location, such as a city, service or institution, attracts a population that uses its services and economic opportunities. Catchment areas may be defined based on from where people are naturally drawn to a location (for example, labour catchment area) or as established by governments or organizations for the provision of services.

Governments and community service organizations often define catchment areas for planning purposes and public safety such as ensuring universal access to services like fire departments, police departments, ambulance bases and hospitals. In business, a catchment area is used to describe the influence from which a retail location draws its customers. Airport catchment areas can inform efforts to estimate route profitability.

Types of catchment areas
Catchments can be defined relative to a location and based upon a number of factors, including distance, travel time, geographic boundaries or population within the catchment. 

Catchment areas generally fall under two categories, those that occur organically, i.e., "de facto" catchment area, and a place people are naturally drawn to, such as a large shopping centre. Catchment areas in terms of a geographical location is a low lying region in which water from higher areas collect into a single water body. The sources of water collected can vary from rainwater to melted snow. Catchment areas may drain their water into other lower lying basins or into a single place, usually a lake, in the case of a closed catchment. A catchment area in terms of a place people are drawn to could be a city, service or institution.

Catchment area boundaries can be modeled using geographic information systems (GIS).  There can be large variability in the services provided within different catchments in the same area depending upon how and when those catchments were established.  They are usually contiguous but can overlap when they describe competing services.

Defining

Identification of "de facto" catchment areas
GIS technology has allowed for the modeling of catchment areas, and in particular those relating to urban areas. Based on travel time between rural areas and cities of different sizes, the urban–rural catchment areas (URCAs) is a global GIS dataset that allows for comparison across countries, such as the distribution of population along the rural–urban continuum. Functional economic areas (FEAs), also called larger urban zone or functional urban areas, are catchment areas of commuters or commuting zones.

When combined with hospital data, catchment areas can define the epidemiological disease burdens or forecast hospital needs amid a disease outbreak.

Establishment of catchment areas for a specific service 
Catchment areas may be established for the provision of services. For example, a school catchment area is the geographic area from which students are eligible to attend a local school. When a facility’s capacity can only service a specific volume, the catchment may be used to limit a population’s ability to access services outside that area. In the case of a school catchment area, children may be unable to enroll in a school outside their catchment to prevent the school's services being exceeded.

Examples
Airports can be built and maintained in locations which minimize the driving distance for the surrounding population to reach them.  
A neighborhood or district of a city often has several small convenience shops, each with a catchment area of several streets.  Supermarkets, on the other hand, have a much lower density, with catchment areas of several neighborhoods (or several villages in rural areas).  This principle, similar to the central place theory, makes catchment areas an important area of study for geographers, economists, and urban planners.
In order to compensate for income inequalities, distances, variations in secondary educational level, and other similar factors, a nation may structure its higher education catchment areas to ensure a good mixture of students from different backgrounds.
Hong Kong divides its primary schools into School Nets under its Primary One Admission System, functioning as catchment areas for allocation of school places.
To inform prospective employers, transport providers, planners and local authorities, data detailing the travel to work patterns of seven towns in the Western Region of Ireland were used to define each towns’ labour catchments.

See also
City region
Commuting zone
Hinterland
Larger urban zone
Rural-urban commuting area
School district
Urban planning

References

External links
  http://www.owlapps.net/application-geomarketing: catchment area calculations free webapp 
 List of Nigerian Universities Catchment Areas 
 Global visualization of Urban–Rural Catchment Areas

Human geography
Economic geography